El Salvador is a predominantly Christian country, with adherents Islam being a minuscule minority. Due to secular nature of the country's constitution, Muslims are free to proselytize and build places of worship in the country.

There is a small Muslim community in El Salvador, largely consisting of Yemeni Arabs. However, the majority of the Palestinian Arab population in the country are Christian. It is estimated that there are about 1000-1500 Muslims in El Salvador, however the figure can reach up to 18,000.

There is an Islamic Cultural Association operated by the Shia community, named Fatimah Az-Zahra. They published the first Islamic magazine in Central America: Revista Biblioteca Islámica. Additionally, they are credited with providing the first and only Islamic library dedicated to spreading Islamic culture in the country. Ahmadiyya Muslim Community also exists in the country.

Background

20th-century immigration
The arrival of families emigrating from Arab countries (Syria, Lebanon and Palestine) primarily occurred during the early 20th century. However, the majority of these Middle Eastern immigrants were Christian - of the few Muslim families, little or nothing has been documented.

Centers
In 1994, the first center of Islamic worship was inaugurated in El Salvador, named Centro Islámico Árabe Salvadoreño, founded in the capital city of San Salvador by a group of Salvadoran nationals and individuals of Palestinian ancestry. In 2004, a second mosque was inaugurated in the capital by Shiites, they named it Fátimah Az-Zahra, in honor of Fatimah, the daughter of the Islamic prophet Muhammad from his first wife Khadija. They began diffusing Islamic literature through the Internet, inaugurating the country's first Islamic Website that includes the publication of a quarterly magazine and that currently counts more than 100 digitized Islamic books. In 2007, a third mosque, called the Dar-Ibrahim Mosque, was inaugurated in San Salvador.

The Islamic Centers are generally involved in performing the Friday congregational prayers known as Salaat-al-Jummah, distributing literature, charitable activities, online propagation and donating informative materials on Islam to various religious and cultural institutions throughout the country. For example, the Fátimah Az-Zahra Islamic Center provides introductory classes on Islamic doctrine and history. These classes, which are open to the general public, are not solely religious in nature: courses in foreign languages and efforts to improve adult literacy are also offered.

Mosques
 Dar-Ibrahim Mosque

See also
Islam by country

Notes

References

El Islam en El Salvador
Oficina de Divulgación Islámica, Fátimah Az-Zahra
Pedro Escalante & Abraham Daura Molina (2001), Sobre Moros y Cristianos, y otros Arabismos en El Salvador, Embajada de España en El Salvador y Agencia Española de Cooperación Internacional, San Salvador, ES pp. 17
Archivo Electrónico de la Prensa Gráfica, correspondiente al 17 de febrero de 2008
Revista Comunica de la UCA
Mauricio Pineda Cruz, Carlos (July 2005). Al-Qaeda's Unlikely Allies in Central America. Terrorism Monitor Vol. 3, Issue 1
Marín-Guzmán, Roberto (2000). A Century of Palestinian Immigration into Central America: A study of their economic and cultural contributions. San Jose, CR: Universidad de Costa Rica.
Pagano, Néstor y Amoretti, María.Los Imames de la Buena Guia de la familia del Profeta Muhammad. Biblioteca Islámica Fátimah Az-Zahra
Pagano, Néstor.Jesús, Hijo de María En el Corán y la Tradición

External links
El Sitio de Los Musulmanes Shiítas de El Salvador
Oficina de Divulgación Islámica, San Salvador, San Salvador
Centro Islámico